Pupil day, also known as "13-Aban-57" is a day of commemoration in Iran.; On this day, Iranians remember the massacre of a number of Tehran's pupils who were gathered at the campus of University of Tehran in order to protest against the regime of the Shah of Iran on the morning of 13th Aban (month) 1357 (4 November 1978).

Event 
At the mentioned date, i.e. On 13 Aban, at the demonstration which was also run by other groups of people (as well as pupils), the quarrel was commenced with tear gas, then by bullets. Eventually, 56 pupils—and a number of other presented people—were killed by the army of the Shah; likewise hundreds of them were injured.

See also 
 Student Day (Iran)

References 

Observances set by the Solar Hijri calendar
November observances
Autumn events in Iran